Aaron Neary (born November 15, 1992) is an American football center who is a free agent. He played college football at Eastern Washington.

College career
Neary attended and played college football for Eastern Washington University.

Professional career

Denver Broncos
Neary was signed by the Denver Broncos as an undrafted free agent on May 2, 2016. He was waived on September 3, 2016.

Philadelphia Eagles
On September 5, 2016, Neary was signed to the Philadelphia Eagles' practice squad. He signed a reserve/future contract with the Eagles on January 2, 2017. He was waived by the team on September 2, 2017.

Los Angeles Rams
On September 3, 2017, Neary was claimed off waivers by the Los Angeles Rams. He was waived by the team on September 16, 2017 and re-signed to the practice squad. He was promoted to the active roster on December 27, 2017. He made his NFL debut in Week 17 against the San Francisco 49ers, earning the start at center as the Rams rested many of their starters, including starting center John Sullivan.

On August 31, 2018, Neary was waived by the Rams.

Cleveland Browns
On September 2, 2018, Neary was claimed off waivers by the Cleveland Browns. He was waived on September 6, 2018.

Los Angeles Rams (second stint)
On September 11, 2018, Neary was signed to the Los Angeles Rams' practice squad. He signed a reserve/future contract with the Rams on February 8, 2019.

Neary was suspended the first four games of the 2019 season for a violation of the league’s substance abuse policy. He suffered a broken ankle in the preseason and was ruled out for the year. He was placed on the reserve/suspended list on August 31, 2019. He was waived from the reserve/suspended list with an injury settlement on September 10. He was reinstated from suspension by the NFL on October 1, 2019, while still a free agent.

Chicago Bears
On November 3, 2020, Neary was signed to the Chicago Bears practice squad. He was elevated to the active roster on November 8 for the team's week 9 game against the Tennessee Titans, and reverted to the practice squad after the game. He was released on November 10.

San Francisco 49ers
On December 16, 2020, Neary was signed to the San Francisco 49ers' practice squad. He was released on January 2, 2021.

Personal life
On September 16, 2018, Neary was arrested for misdemeanor DUI and hit and run by the Simi Valley Police Department.

References

External links
Eastern Washington Eagles bio

1992 births
Living people
American football centers
Players of American football from Washington (state)
People from Richland, Washington
Eastern Washington Eagles football players
Denver Broncos players
Philadelphia Eagles players
Los Angeles Rams players
Cleveland Browns players
Chicago Bears players
San Francisco 49ers players